Albert Keast (2 July 1895 – 20 April 1969) was a New Zealand cricketer. He played four first-class matches for Otago between 1917 and 1923.

See also
 List of Otago representative cricketers

References

External links
 

1895 births
1969 deaths
New Zealand cricketers
Otago cricketers
Cricketers from Dunedin